Doree Lewak is an American writer and humorist. Lewak lives in New York City and has written for The New York Post, The New York Times, Entertainment Weekly, Glamour, The Jerusalem Post, The Huffington Post, Time Out New York, Newsday, and New York Daily News.

Lewak is best known as the author of the 2008 book  The Panic Years: A Guide to Surviving Smug Married Friends, Bad Taffeta, and Life on the Wrong Side of 25 without a Ring.  The Panic Years offers advice on how to change one's relationship strategy to find a marriage partner.  Library Journal  called the book “sassy and humorous.” 

Critics found Lewak’s insistence that women should make matrimony a goal, “repulsive,”  and criticized Lewak for “reinforc(ing) negative stereotypes.”

References

American humorists
American women writers
Living people
Women humorists
Writers from New York City
Year of birth missing (living people)
21st-century American women